All in One Voice is the twelfth studio album by Welsh singer Bonnie Tyler.  It was released in 1998 by EastWest Records, following her previous album with EastWest, Free Spirit (1995). The album remains the least commercially successful in Tyler's career as it failed to chart worldwide.

Recording 
Tracks produced by Jimmy Smyth were recorded at Full Moon, Westland and Park House Studios in Dublin, Ireland. "The Reason Why" was recorded at Boogie Park Studios in Hamburg, and "I Put a Spell on You" was recorded for Mike Batt's album Philharmania at Abbey Road Studios in London. The remaining tracks were recorded at Red Deer Studios in Germany.

Promotion

Singles 
"He's the King" was released ahead of All in One Voice in December 1997. The song was originally used for the German TV series . Tyler made an appearance in one of the episodes performing the song in a casino. "He's the King" spent one week on the German Singles Chart at number 95.

"Heaven" was released as the second single in 1998. The song was first performed at Melodifestivalen 1997—Sweden's national selection competition for the Eurovision Song Contest—by N-Mix, under the title "Där en ängel hälsat på" (Where an angel has visited in English), where it came 2nd.

Track listing

Personnel
Credits are adapted from the album's liner notes; the credits for tracks 8–14 are incomplete.

Musicians 

 Bonnie Tyler – lead vocals , backing vocals 
 Jimmy Smyth – production , backing vocals , choir arrangement , electric guitar , acoustic guitar , gut string guitar , programming  Hammond organ , bass 
 Graham Laybourne – production , programming , keyboards , backing vocals , mandolin , Gibson guitars 
 Harold Faltermeyer – production , arrangement 
 Gernot Rothenbach – production 
 Mike Batt – production , arrangement , conducting 
 Tessa Niles – backing vocals 
 Katie Kissoon – backing vocals 
 Jenny Newman – backing vocals 
 Ed Kenehan – backing vocals 
 Conor Stevens – backing vocals 
 Karen Hammill – backing vocals 
 Robbie Casserly – backing vocals 
 Irish Film Orchestra 
 Fiachra Trench – strings arrangements 
 David Downes – uilleann pipes , low whistle , choir arrangement 
 Paul McAteer – additional drums 
 Anto Drennan – electric guitar , gut string guitar 
 Frank Gallagher – violin , viola , fiddle , tin whistle 
 Tom Molloy – bass 
 Billy Farrell – programming 
 Peter McKinney – additional drums 
 Gerry O'Connor – violin 
 Benjamin Hüllenkrämer – bass 
 Axel Wernecke – drums 
 Maik Bösenberg – percussion 
 Herbert Böhme – backing vocals 
 Sebi – special effects 
 Andreas Linse – arrangement

Technical 

 Achim Kruse – mastering 
 Graham Laybourne – remixing 
 Harold Faltermeyer – engineering , mixing 
 Gernot Rothenbach – engineering , mixing 
 David Cooke – mixing 
 Bill Somerville-Large – engineering 
 Jon Mallison – engineering 
 Tim Martin – engineering 
 Ed Kenehan – assistant engineering 
 Ciaran Cahill – assistant engineering 
 Ryan Martin – assistant engineering

References

1999 albums
Bonnie Tyler albums
East West Records albums